Pavel Anatolyevich Samoylov (born 23 January 1982) is a Russian professional football coach and a former player. He is an assistant coach with FC Tom Tomsk.

Club career
He played five seasons in the Russian Football National League for FC Sibir Novosibirsk, FC Metallurg-Kuzbass Novokuznetsk and FC Dynamo Barnaul.

References

External links
 

1982 births
Sportspeople from Tomsk
Living people
Russian footballers
Association football defenders
FC Sibir Novosibirsk players
FC Novokuznetsk players
FK Rīga players
FC Dynamo Barnaul players
FC Gornyak Uchaly players
FC Tom Tomsk players
Latvian Higher League players
Russian expatriate footballers
Expatriate footballers in Latvia
Russian expatriate sportspeople in Latvia